The Ethisphere Institute is a for-profit company that defines and measures corporate ethical standards, recognizes companies that excel, and promotes best practices in corporate ethics. The company is located in Scottsdale, Arizona.

The company publishes Ethisphere Magazine and announces its World's Most Ethical Companies award once a year. The company also offers verification services for corporate ethics under such names as "Ethics Inside Certification" and "Compliance Leader Verification". It hosts the Global Ethics Summit every March in New York City and manages a community of compliance, ethics and legal professionals known as BELA, the Business Ethics Leadership Alliance.

Operations
The Executive Chairman of Ethisphere, Alex Brigham, created the institute in 2007, as part of Corpedia, a compliance training company. In 2010, Corpedia was sold but Ethisphere's ownership was retained by Brigham. Tim Erblich is Ethisphere's CEO.

Criticism
Ethisphere has been criticized for its business model and the possible conflict of interest created when other companies pay for an assessment. Ethisphere assesses companies based on self-reported data and a survey. Companies dubbed "most ethical" by Ethisphere include Eastman Chemical and Blue Shield of California, despite the involvement of both in major public scandals at the time. Companies that are recognized often advertise for Ethisphere and pay additional licensing fees for the right to use the year-specific World’s Most Ethical Companies logo.

References

External links 
 

Management consulting firms of the United States
Business ethics organizations
Consulting firms established in 2007
Companies based in Scottsdale, Arizona
2007 establishments in Arizona